Smiley Face or Smiley Faces may refer to:

 Smiley face, a stylized representation of a smiling humanoid face
 Smiley Face (film), a 2007 American film
 "The Smiley Face", a 2011 Curb Your Enthusiasm TV episode
 "Smiley Faces", a song by Gnarls Barkley
 "Smiley Face", a 2020 song by Duck Sauce

See also
 Smiley face curve, a graphic equalizer adjustment with reduced midrange content
 Smiley face murder theory, a theory that drowning victims were instead murdered
 Smiley (disambiguation)